Nyce Ayuk is an African-born author, serial entrepreneur, and business coach. He leverages his vast knowledge and wealth of experience in educating people across the globe on how to create financial confidence for themselves. Nyce is the founder of Breakout Academy. He holds an MSc in Oil and Gas Management from Coventry University and a BSc in Business Management from the University of Calabar in Nigeria.

Early life and education

Nyce  born Nyce Atta-Achu Ayuk in Calabar the capital of Cross River State, Nigeria. he studied at the University of Calabar and did his second degree at Coventry University. He returned to Nigeria in 2013 to serve as a Special Adviser on New Media to a Senator of the Federal Republic of Nigeria.

Bibliography
E-Commerce Revolution: THE NEW WEALTH FRONTIER IN AFRICA The book, A Global Expert's View on How Wealth Can be created. Independently Published (25 Sept. 2020).

References

Nigerian company founders
Startup accelerators
Living people
Year of birth missing (living people)